Super Turrican 2 is a 16-bit shooter game for the Super Nintendo Entertainment System, developed by Factor 5 and marketed by Ocean Software in 1995. Part of the Turrican series, it is the sequel to Super Turrican for the same platform.

The game was released on the Virtual Console in North America on September 29, 2008. However, it was retired without any explanation in October 2013 in the same region.

Story 
The location is a small star system floating in the endless spiral arms of a black hole. Little do the inhabitants of the planets know about the menacing hordes of The Machine. Fleeing through the outer regions of the known galaxy, the villain found his next victims. Long since his last defeat, The Machine has returned and the defenses of the star system are no match for The Machine's phasers launched from deep space. Civilizations were destroyed in an instant and the whole system fell under the spell of evil, with just a few tiny cries for help escaping the boundaries of the system.

In the U.S.S. Avalon, flagship of the United Freedom Forces, the heroes of many rescued souls are restlessly waiting for the final encounter with their longtime arch-enemy. As the sirens yell across the hangar, three ships blast off into the unknown. Ready to face their final challenge, the ships prepare to enter a black hole in order to reach the attacked system. But seconds later, only one of the ships manage to escape the dangerous influence of the black hole.

Badly damaged and burning, the ship hurtles towards a devastated dune world. Shipwrecked somewhere in this devastated realm is the last remaining survivor of the assault squad team sent by the United Freedom Forces. Equipped with his Turrican assault suit, he has to face alone the attempt to stop The Machine's plan to transform the devastated galaxy into his new army stronghold.

Gameplay
Super Turrican 2 features more straightforward shooting action and uses Dolby Pro-Logic surround sound as well as many "Mode 7" effects, but sacrifices the big levels of the original Turrican games by playing more similar to the Konami Contra series. The major addition is a grappling arm, similar to that used in Bionic Commando, which can be used to swing between platforms and grab power-ups.

The game features different vehicles such as a desert dune buggy, a space motorcycle and an underwater motojet.

Reception

GamePro gave the game a rave review. They applauded the varied battlefield settings, "flawless" controls, "stunning" visuals, powerful explosions, and strong soundtrack, and concluded that "Super Turrican 2 has been in the works for some time, and it's been worth every waiting moment."

IGN ranked the game at 93rd in their "Top 100 SNES Games of All Time." In 1995, Total! rated the game 59th on its Top 100 SNES Games writing: "The original C64 Turrican games were a bit ropey but this is a classic blaster in every way."

Notes

References 

1995 video games
Super Nintendo Entertainment System games
Ocean Software games
Virtual Console games
Science fiction video games
Run and gun games
Turrican
Video game sequels
Video games scored by Chris Huelsbeck
Video games developed in Germany
Side-scrolling video games
Single-player video games
Video games set in the 31st century
Factor 5 games